Ayyappanpillai Ajayaghosh (born 30 July 1962) is an organic chemist, academic and the former director of the National Institute for Interdisciplinary Science and Technology. He is known for his studies on supramolecular assemblies and light induced sensor systems and is an elected fellow of all the three major Indian science academies viz. the National Academy of Sciences, India, Indian National Science Academy and the Indian Academy of Sciences as well as The World Academy of Sciences. The Council of Scientific and Industrial Research, the apex agency of the Government of India for scientific research, awarded him the Shanti Swarup Bhatnagar Prize for Science and Technology, one of the highest Indian science awards for his contributions to Chemical Sciences in 2007. He received the TWAS Prize of The World Academy of Sciences in 2013.

Biography 

A. Ajayaghosh, born on 30 July 1962 in Kollam in the south Indian state of Kerala, graduated in science from the University of Kerala and completed his master's degree from the same university in 1984. Subsequently, working under the guidance of V. N. Rajasekharan Pillai, he secured a PhD from University of Calicut in 1989; his thesis was based on Solid-phase Peptide Synthesis.

His career started in 1988 at the National Institute for Interdisciplinary Science and Technology (NIIST), then known as Regional Research Laboratory, of the Council of Scientific and Industrial Research, as a Scientist (Grade-C) and held various grades before reaching the position of a Scientist Grade-H and the head of the Photosciences and Photonics Group of NIIST in 2010. He is the director of the Institute since 2015 and holds the additional responsibility as the Dean of Chemical Sciences, Academy of Scientific and Innovative Research (AcSIR) New Delhi. In between, he had a short stint abroad, as an Alexander von Humboldt Fellow at the Max Planck Institute for Strahlen Chemie, Germany during 1994–96. He also serves as an adjunct professor of Material Science Programme at the Indian Institute of Technology, Kanpur.

Ajayaghosh is married to Ambili and the couple has two children. The family lives in Thiruvananthapuram, Kerala.

Legacy 
Ajayaghosh's researches have been principally in the fields of supramolecular chemistry, chemosensors, low band-gap polymers, fluorescent gels, organic nanostructures and photoresponsive systems and he is reported to have done extensive researches on supramolecular architecture and light-induced sensor systems. He is known to have pioneered the study of molecular self-assembly in India and is credited with the creation of a new category of self-assembled materials that are functionally soft. His work assisted in the design of larger molecular structures using self-assembling molecules and demonstrated ways to control their electricity conductivity through controlling external factors like temperature which have reported use in applications involving light harvesting, sensing, imaging and security. He was the first scientist to design functional Phenylenevinylene-based Organogels from designed building blocks, which has been detailed in his article, First Phenylenevinylene Based Organogels:  Self-Assembled Nanostructures via Cooperative Hydrogen Bonding and π-Stacking, published in 2001. One of the commercial applications of his researches is secret writing, thermally writable, non-copyable, and erasable fluorescent images useful for secret documentation by using a fluorescent gelator entrapped in a polystyrene film and the process has been developed by his team. His studies have been documented in several peer-reviewed articles; ResearchGate and Google Scholar, online repositories of scientific articles, have listed 202 and 162 of them respectively. He also holds patents for a number of processes he has developed.

Ajayaghosh is associated with a number of science journals around the world. He is an associate editor of Physical Chemistry Chemical Physics (PCCP), published by the Royal Society of Chemistry and a senior editor of the Bulletin of the Chemical Society of Japan. He is a former member of the advisory board of RSC Advances and sits in the editorial board of Chemistry: An Asian Journal. He has also guided several master's and doctoral scholars in their studies and has been involved in programs for popularization of science and science awareness campaigns.

Patents

Selected articles

Awards 
Ajayaghosh received the Young Scientist Award of the Indian Science Congress Association in 1988 and the Young Scientist Medal of the Indian National Science Academy in 1991. The Chemical Research Society of India awarded him the Bronze Medal in 2002 and he received the MRSI Medal of the Materials Research Society of India in 2007. The Council of Scientific and Industrial Research awarded him the Shanti Swarup Bhatnagar Prize, one of the highest Indian science awards the same year. Two years later, he received the Thomson Reuters Research Excellence Award (2009) and the Outstanding Researcher Award of the Department of Atomic Energy. He received the fourth Infosys Prize in the Physical Sciences in 2012 making him the first chemist to receive the honor; the citation mentioning his pioneering development of methods for the construction of functional nano materials. The Chemical Research Society of India honored him again with a Silver Medal in 2013 and the TWAS Prize reached him the same year.

Ajayaghosh received the Alexander von Humboldt Fellowship in 1994 and the Swarna Jayanthi Fellowship of the Department of Science and Technology in 2001. The Indian Academy of Sciences elected him as a fellow in 2007, the same year as he received the Ramanna Fellowship of the Department of Science and Technology. He became an elected fellow of the National Academy of Sciences, India in 2011 and the Indian National Science Academy followed suit in 2013. He received the J. C. Bose National Fellowship of Science and Engineering Research Board and the elected fellowship of The World Academy of Sciences in (2015. He is also a fellow of the Royal Society of Chemistry and an honorary fellow of the Kerala Academy of Sciences.

See also 

 Macromolecular assembly
 Molecular self-assembly
 Nanoparticles
 Hydrogen bond

References

External links 
 
 
 

Living people
1962 births
20th-century Indian physicists
Scientists from Kerala
Fellows of the Indian National Science Academy
TWAS laureates
Fellows of the Indian Academy of Sciences
People from Kollam district
Fellows of The National Academy of Sciences, India
University of Kerala alumni
University of Calcutta alumni
TWAS fellows
Indian patent holders
21st-century Indian inventors
Indian scientific authors